Viken is a lake in Sweden. It is located in Västra Götaland County, where it straddles the border between Karlsborg and Töreboda municipalities.

The lake is a part of the Göta canal, where it reaches its highest point – 91.8 m a.s.l.

References

Lakes of Västra Götaland County